"Love Is the Plan the Plan Is Death" is a short story by James Tiptree, Jr., a pen name used by American writer Alice Sheldon. The novella won a Nebula Award for Best Short Story in 1974. It first appeared in the anthology The Alien Condition, edited by Stephen Goldin, published by Ballantine Books in April 1973.

Plot

The story is told in the first person by Moggadeet, a self-aware male of a species which appears to be a top predator in its environment. This species seems to be cold-blooded, possibly an arthropod, with various features that come into play in battle, nurturing the young (for females), and sex. Moggadeet’s mother and an older male have supplemented his instincts by making him aware of the Plan, i.e., the normal life-cycle of his species. The element of this Plan he most resists is cannibalism of other members of the species. 

Moggadeet narrates his life from the moment he meets his mate in the spring of his second year, including his memories of his first year. After a while he remembers what his mate said at various points, expressing fears and concerns. By the end it becomes clear that Moggadeet is telling this story to his mate while she is eating him; he assumes she agrees with his recollections.

Collections

"Love is the Plan the Plan is Death" has appeared in the following collections:

The Alien Condition edited by Stephen Goldin (1973) 
 Nebula Award Stories 9 edited by Kate Wilhelm (1974) 
 Warm Worlds and Otherwise by James Tiptree Jr (1975) 
 The Future I edited by Joseph D. Olander, Martin H. Greenberg, and Isaac Asimov (1981) 
 Great Science Fiction: Stories by the World's Great Scientists edited by Isaac Asimov, Martin H. Greenberg, and Charles G. Waugh (1985) 
Byte Beautiful: Eight Science Fiction Stories by James Tiptree Jr (1985)
 The Science Fiction Hall of Fame, Volume IV edited by Terry Carr (1986)
 The Best of the Nebulas edited by Ben Bova (1989)
 Her Smoke Rose Up Forever by James Tiptree Jr (1990)

Reception

"Love is the Plan the Plan Is Death" won the 1974 Nebula Award for Best Short Story and was nominated for the Hugo Award for Best Novelette, and was ranked 3rd in the Locus Magazine poll for Best Short Fiction.

Kirkus Reviews called it "highly lauded." The Washington Post considered that the "image (of) an intelligent species whose biological imperatives compel females to devour their mates (...) is dramatized with the directness of an arrow striking a bullseye".

References
Notes

Bibliography

 Clute, John and Peter Nicholls. The Encyclopedia of Science Fiction. New York City: St. Martin's Griffin, 1993 (2nd edition 1995). .

External links
 Text of the story at Lightspeed
 
 

1973 short stories
Nebula Award for Best Short Story-winning works
Works by James Tiptree Jr.